Cable Noticias is a Colombian 24-hour cable television news channel owned by Medellín-based company Global Media. On August 5, 2011 Alberto Federico Ravell purchased Cable Noticias. The channel operates out of Bogotá, Colombia.

References

External links
 Official website

Television networks in Colombia
24-hour television news channels
Television stations in Colombia
Television channels and stations established in 2007
Spanish-language television stations